Golden is a town in Tishomingo County, Mississippi, United States. The population was 191 at the 2010 census.  The village's current mayor is Davy Ginn.

History 
The community of Golden originally sprang up around Golden Sawmill. Almost all of the inhabitants of Golden were employed by the sawmill, and its decline corresponded with a decline in the town's prosperity. The building of the railroad in the early 1900s brought new life to the town and it was incorporated on February 8, 1908. The town was named for the baby of one of the area's early settlers, Golden Patrie Wiggins.

Geography
Golden is located at  (34.487217, -88.187427). The town is concentrated along Mississippi Highway 366 in southern Tishomingo County. It lies just southeast of Belmont, and a few miles west of the Mississippi-Alabama border.  In Golden, MS 366 runs in a southeastward direction from Belmont before bending sharply to the northeast near the center of town, and then veering southeastward again en route to Red Bay, Alabama, where it becomes 4th Street.

Communities near Golden
 Belmont - 
 Red Bay, Alabama - 
 Vina, Alabama -

Rivers and streams
 Bear Creek
 Epps Branch
 Wofford Branch

Demographics

As of the census of 2000, there were 201 people, 87 households, and 52 families residing in the town. The population density was 354.2 people per square mile (136.2/km2). There were 106 housing units at an average density of 186.8 per square mile (71.8/km2). The racial makeup of the town was 91.04% White, 1.00% African American, 7.46% from other races, and 0.50% from two or more races. Hispanic or Latino of any race were 9.95% of the population.

There were 87 households, out of which 24.1% had children under the age of 18 living with them, 51.7% were married couples living together, 3.4% had a female householder with no husband present, and 39.1% were non-families. 33.3% of all households were made up of individuals, and 14.9% had someone living alone who was 65 years of age or older. The average household size was 2.31 and the average family size was 2.92.

In the town, the population was spread out, with 17.9% under the age of 18, 12.9% from 18 to 24, 30.3% from 25 to 44, 17.4% from 45 to 64, and 21.4% who were 65 years of age or older. The median age was 38 years. For every 100 females, there were 103.0 males. For every 100 females age 18 and over, there were 108.9 males.

The median income for a household in the town was $20,208, and the median income for a family was $33,333. Males had a median income of $26,250 versus $19,250 for females. The per capita income for the town was $13,047. About 19.4% of families and 19.0% of the population were below the poverty line, including 14.3% of those under the age of eighteen and 37.1% of those 65 or over.

The mayor of the village of Golden is Davy Ginn.  He is also the teacher for the only school near Golden, Belmont public Schools.  Ginn has served for 10 years and is well respected throughout the town.

Education

Public schools
The Town of Golden is served by the Tishomingo County School District.

Transportation

Highways
 Mississippi Highway 366 - runs southeast to the Alabama state line

References

External links

Towns in Tishomingo County, Mississippi
Towns in Mississippi